The 2013 Uzbekistan PFL Cup is the first edition of a pre-season football competition held in Uzbekistan. 2013 saw the competition as a prelude to the 2013 domestic football season. Not all teams from Uzbekistan took part, notably Lokomotiv Tashkent and Pakhtakor were represented by their second string sides.

The competition featured two groups of 5 teams, with the top two advancing to the semi-final stages.

Group stage

Group A

Group B

Semi finals

Final

References

External links
 http://www.futbol24.com/national/Uzbekistan/PFL-Cup/2013/ futbol24.com

Uzbekistan PFL Cup
PFL Cup